"What Would You Do (If Jesus Came to Your House)" is a country gospel song, written by Yolanda Adams, Errol McCalla Jr., Jonathan Broussard and Marcus Ecby, and popularized in 1956 by up-and-coming country singer Porter Wagoner.

Wagoner's version reached No. 8 on the Billboard country charts in the spring of 1956, and was the higher of two competing chart versions released that year. Also in 1956, another up-and-coming country singer, Red Sovine, released his own version on Decca Records, which peaked at No. 15. For Sovine, although the main chorus – What would you do/if Jesus came to your house/to spend some time with you – is sung, it was one of his first songs that were spoken, as most of his later well-known songs were.

Chart performance

Porter Wagoner version

Red Sovine version

References

1956 singles
Porter Wagoner songs
RCA Records singles
Decca Records singles
1956 songs
Song recordings produced by Stephen H. Sholes